Andem is a town in western Gabon. It is originally spoken in Fang language and Ibibio language as Āñdém (in correct form). It was incorrectly recorded by French as Andem as there was no literal translation.

Transport 
It is served by a station on the Trans-Gabon Railway.

See also 
 Transport in Gabon

References 

Populated places in Moyen-Ogooué Province
Abanga-Bigne Department